The 2003 Latvian Individual Speedway Championship was the 29th Latvian Individual Speedway Championship season. The final took place on 12 October 2003 in Daugavpils, Latvia.

Results
 October 12, 2003
  Daugavpils

Speedway in Latvia
2003 in Latvian sport
2003 in speedway